"Figure It Out" is a single by American rapper French Montana, featuring Kanye West and Nas. The track was released on May 6, 2016 as the first single from Montana's mixtape MC4 (2016). It was also released as the first single from his mixtape Wave Gods (2016), which was released at an earlier date than the single itself.

Background
Montana initially revealed that he had been working on music with West in July 2014 when he shared a snippet of a collaboration between them via Instagram. However, this snippet was revealed at a later date to be part of an unreleased track titled "Ass Shots" when it surfaced online in full.

"Figure It Out" didn't mark the only time that Montana was involved musically with Kanye West in its year of release, since he had vocals on "Siiiiiiiiilver Surffffeeeeer Intermission" from West's album The Life of Pablo (2016).

Music video
On March 6, 2016, Montana shared a photo online of him and the two featured artists filming a music video for the song. It was officially released on May 5, 2016 and was filmed in a desert. Two days after the release of the music video, West tweeted out a link to it and also expressed his enjoyment from filming with Montana and Nas.

Charts

Release history

References

External links
 

2016 singles
2016 songs
French Montana songs
Kanye West songs
Nas songs
Song recordings produced by DJ Khalil
Songs written by French Montana
Songs written by DJ Khalil
Songs written by Kanye West
Songs written by Nas
Songs written by Erik Alcock